Pulisic or Pulišić is a Croatian surname. Notable people with the name include:

Christian Pulisic (born 1998), American soccer player
Mark Pulisic (born 1968), American soccer coach and former player, father of Christian Pulisic
Will Pulisic (born 1998), American soccer player
Vinko Pulišić (1853–1936), Croatian Roman Catholic Archbishop 

Croatian surnames